Maslyanino is an urban locality (an urban-type settlement) in Maslyaninsky District of Novosibirsk Oblast, Russia. Population:

References

Urban-type settlements in Novosibirsk Oblast
Populated places on the Berd River